An audio converter is a device or software that converts an audio signal from one format to another.

Hardware audio converters include analog-to-digital converters (ADCs), which convert analog audio to uncompressed digital form (e.g., PCM), and their reciprocal partners, digital-to-analog converters (DACs), which convert uncompressed digital audio to analog form. ADCs and DACs are usually components of hardware products. For example, sound cards and capture cards both include ADCs to allow a computer to record audio. Sound cards also feature DACs for audio playback.

Some audio conversion functions can be performed by software or by specialized hardware. For example, an audio transcoder converts from one compressed audio format to another (e.g., MP3 to AAC) by means of two audio codecs: One for decoding (uncompressing) the source and one for encoding (compressing) the destination file or stream.

See also
 Audio file format
 Comparison of audio coding formats
 List of audio conversion software

Audio software
Digital signal processing